This article is on the Japanese Scouting figure.  For the samurai, please see Hōjō Tokiyuki.

 was an educator, mathematician and politician in Meiji period Japan. He was the twelfth head of Gakushūin Peers’ School, and an early Japanese Scouting notable.

Biography 
Hōjō was born as the second son of a samurai retainer of the Maeda clan of Kanazawa Domain, (now Kanazawa City, Ishikawa Prefecture. His family claimed descent from the famous Hōjō family of Kamakura.

In 1885, Hōjō graduated from the Mathematics Department, Science Faculty of Tokyo Imperial University. He was hired as a teacher at Ishikawa Prefectural Technical School in his home town of Kanazawa, but returned to Tokyo in 1888 to attend the graduate school of Tokyo Imperial University. In 1894, he became deputy principal of Yamaguchi High School in Yamaguchi Prefecture, becoming principal of the same school in 1896. However, in 1898, he was transferred to assume the job of principal of Ishikawa Prefecture Technical School, which had by that time been renamed the Fourth High School. He then transferred in 1902 to become first principal of Hiroshima Normal High School (now Hiroshima University).

In 1908, Hōjō attended an international conference on morality in London, England, at the request of Japanese Minister of Culture, . One of the reasons for his trip was to conduct a survey of the British Scouting organization, and its applicability towards furthering the Japanese government's program of instilling moral education in schools. He returned to Japan with Scout uniforms and documents on Scouting, and took an active role in promoting the Japanese Scouting movement in Hiroshima and elsewhere in Japan.
In 1913, Hōjō was appointed head of Tohoku Imperial University. He became head of the Gakushūin Peers's School in 1917.

In 1920, Hōjō became an advisor to the Imperial Court, and was appointed a member of the House of Peers of the Diet of Japan.

On April 27, 1929, he died of liver cancer, aged 71.

See also

Sources 
Much of this article was translated from the equivalent article in the Japanese Wikipedia, as referenced on December 23, 2008.

Hōjō clan
Members of the House of Peers (Japan)
Heads of schools in Japan
19th-century Japanese mathematicians
20th-century Japanese mathematicians
University of Tokyo alumni
Scouting in Japan
1858 births
1929 deaths
Scouting pioneers
People from Kanazawa, Ishikawa
People of Meiji-period Japan
Deaths from cancer in Japan
Deaths from liver cancer
Tohoku University
Academic staff of Hiroshima University